The second season of the American television series Superman & Lois premiered on The CW on January 11, 2022 and concluded on June 28, 2022, airing 15 episodes.  The series is based on the DC Comics characters Superman and Lois Lane created by Jerry Siegel and Joe Shuster. The season was produced by Berlanti Productions, DC Entertainment, and Warner Bros. Television. Initially considered to be part of the shared fictional Arrowverse (where Hoechlin and Tulloch originated their roles) in the first season, the second season establishes the series set in an alternate universe from the Arrowverse.

The series stars Tyler Hoechlin and Elizabeth Tulloch as the titular characters, Clark Kent / Superman, a costumed superhero, and his wife, Lois Lane who deal with the Inverse Method cult led by Ally Allston who has swayed Lois' sister, Lucy to her side and has made an enemy of Bizarro for her supposed conquering of his world. Also returning are main cast members Jordan Elsass, Alex Garfin, Erik Valdez, Inde Navarrette, Wolé Parks, Dylan Walsh, and Emmanuelle Chriqui, with Tayler Buck and Sofia Hasmik being promoted from their guest and recurring status in the previous season. Superman & Lois was renewed for a second season by The CW in March 2021 and filming took place primarily in Surrey, British Columbia.

The season premiere was watched by 1.09 million viewers, becoming the CW's most-watched premiere for the 2021–22 season. Superman & Lois was renewed for a third season in March 2022.

Cast and characters

Main
 Tyler Hoechlin as Kal-El / Clark Kent / Superman
 Daniel Cudmore portrays Bizarro's armored appearance.
 Elizabeth Tulloch as Lois Lane
 Jordan Elsass as Jonathan Kent
 Alex Garfin as Jordan Kent
 Erik Valdez as Kyle Cushing
 Inde Navarrette as Sarah Cushing / Cortez
 Wolé Parks as John Henry Irons
 Dylan Walsh as Samuel Lane
 Emmanuelle Chriqui as Lana Lang-Cushing
 Tayler Buck as Natalie Irons
 Sofia Hasmik as Chrissy Beppo

Recurring
 Ian Bohen as Lieutenant General Mitch Anderson
 Adam Rayner as Morgan Edge / Tal-Rho
 Mariana Klaveno as Lara Lor-Van 
 Jenna Dewan as Lucy Lane
 Rya Kihlstedt as Ally Allston
 Joselyn Picard as Sophie Cushing
 Nathan Witte as Daniel Hart
 Monique Phillips as Aidy Manning
 Danny Wattley as Coach Gaines
 Dee Jay Jackson as Cobb Branden
 Samantha Di Franceso as Candice Pergande
 Toby Hargrave as Chuck Arden
 Cynthia Mendez as Tonya Martinez 
 Stephanie Cho as First Sergeant Erin Wu

Guest
 Eric Keenleyside as George Dean
 Wern Lee as Tag Harris
 David Ramsey as John Diggle
 Catherine Lough Haggquist as Dr. Kit Faulkner
 Hesham Hammoud as Lieutenant Reno Rosetti

Episodes

Production

Development
On March 2, 2021, The CW renewed the series for a second season.

Casting
In June 2021, Hasmik was promoted to a series regular for the second season. In August, Tayler Buck, who guest starred in the first season, was promoted to a series regular for the second season. In October, Ian Bohen was cast in a recurring role as Lt. Mitch Anderson for the second season. Jenna Dewan reprises her role as Lucy Lane from Supergirl. David Ramsey guest stars as John Diggle in the season finale, reprising his role from Arrow.

Costume
This season features a new design of Superman's suit giving slight adjustment to his boots by adding more red, making it more accurate to the comics.

Filming
Principal photography began on September 15, 2021, and concluded on May 5, 2022.

Release
The season began airing in the United States on The CW and in Canada on CTV Sci-Fi Channel on January 11, 2022. The finale aired on June 28, 2022. In the United Kingdom, it premiered on BBC One and BBC iPlayer on July 16, 2022. The entire season was released on HBO Max on July 29, 2022. It was later released on Blu-ray and DVD on September 27, 2022.

Ratings
The premiere of Season 2 was the most-watched premiere for a CW show for the 2021-22 season, in addition to being the most-watched premiere for the channel since Kung Fu in April 2021. 420,000 US households streamed the episode within one day according to Samba TV.

Notes

References 
  Text was copied from Superman & Lois at Wikipedia, which is released under a Creative Commons Attribution-Share Alike 3.0 (Unported) (CC-BY-SA 3.0) license.

External links 
 

Superman & Lois seasons
2022 American television seasons